John Lacy (c. 1615? – 17 September 1681) was an English comic actor and playwright during the Restoration era. In his own time he gained a reputation as "the greatest comedian of his day" and was the favourite comic of King Charles II.

Life
Lacy was born in or near Doncaster; in 1631 he became an apprentice of John Ogilby, when Ogilby was functioning as what was then called a "dancing master"—roughly the equivalent of a modern dance teacher and choreographer. Lacy's stage career began by 1639, when he was a member of Beeston's Boys.

Lacy joined the royalist forces in the English Civil War, and was commissioned an officer (lieutenant and quartermaster). After the English Interregnum period, once Charles II returned to the throne and the London theatres re-opened, Lacy became an actor with the newly formed King's Company.

Lacy quickly evolved into a popular comedian; Samuel Pepys admired and enjoyed his work, as he recorded in his Diary. On 21 May 1662, Pepys saw Lacy in as the title character in a play called The French Dancing-Mistress; on the next day he saw Lacy as Johnny Thump in James Shirley's Love in a Maze. On 12 June 1663 Pepys saw Lacy in Sir Robert Howard's The Committee, and praised Lacy's acting in the role of the Irish footman Teague as "beyond imagination;" on 13 August 1667, Pepys saw the same play, and called Lacy's part "so well performed that it would set off anything." Pepys saw Lacy in his own Sauny the Scot on 9 April 1667.

Lacy was also known for the role of Galliard in the Duke of Newcastle's play The Variety, and Scruple in John Wilson's The Cheats. He played roles in Ben Jonson's comedies: Ananias in The Alchemist, Captain Otter in Epicene, and Sir Politic Would-Be in Volpone. According to Sir George Etheredge, Lacy was the lover of Nell Gwyn along with the King's Company star Charles Hart. After a serious illness in 1668, Lacy recovered and returned to the stage, though he performed less often than before.

Plays
Lacy is credited with the authorship of four plays:
 Sauny the Scot (acted 1667; printed 1698)
 The Dumb Lady, or The Farrier Made Physician (printed 1672)
 The Old Troop, or Monsier Ragou (printed 1672)
 Sir Hercules Buffoon, or The Poetical Squire (printed 1684).

Lacy was more of an adapter than an original artist, however (a not-unusual trait among Restoration dramatists). Sauny the Scot is a prose version of Shakespeare's The Taming of the Shrew. In Lacy's version, Grumio becomes Sauny, a clown who dominates the play, and a role played by Lacy himself. Sir Hercules Buffoon draws upon Philip Massinger's The City Madam and A New Way to Pay Old Debts. The Dumb Lady derives from Molière's Le Médecin malgré lui.

Trouble
His popularity with Charles II did not prevent Lacy from getting into significant trouble at one point in his career. On 15 April 1667 Pepys saw Lacy play in The Change of Crowns, by Edward Howard. The King and Queen were in the audience, along with the Duke of York and his Duchess, and "all the Court". During the performance, Lacy improvised some lines about corruption at Court and the selling of offices. The King was so angry that he had the company banned from performing; and Lacy was incarcerated. Lacy was released on 20 April and had a confrontation with "Ned" Howard; Lacy unreasonably blamed Howard for the trouble he had got himself into with the King. The two theatre men came to blows: Howard hit Lacy in his face with a glove, and Lacy responded by striking Howard over the head with his cane.

The actors prevailed upon the King to allow them to return to the stage, and Lacy was soon forgiven.

Notes

References
Fox, Adam. Oral and Literate Culture in England, 1500–1700. Oxford, Oxford University Press, 2000.
Halliday, F. E. A Shakespeare Companion 1564–1964. Baltimore, Penguin, 1964.
Lacy, John. The Dramatic Works of John Lacy. edited by James Maidment and W. H. Logan; Edinburgh, William Paterson, 1875.

External links
 Lacy's plays online.
 

English dramatists and playwrights
English male stage actors
17th-century English male actors
1681 deaths
Year of birth uncertain
Year of birth unknown
English male dramatists and playwrights